Joan Craddock Fry (6 May 1906 – 29 September 1985) was a British tennis player. Fry was a finalist at the 1925 Wimbledon Championships where she lost in straight sets to Suzanne Lenglen.

She was part of the British team that won the 1930 Wightman Cup against the United States. She lost her singles matches to Helen Wills and Helen Jacobs but together with Ermyntrude Harvey won the doubles match against Sarah Palfrey and Edith Cross.

In 1930 she was a finalist at the British Covered Court Championships, played at the Queen's Club in London.

On 12 November 1930 she married  Thomas Ashley Lakeman, a lieutenant in the Royal Tank Corps.

Grand Slam finals

Singles: 1 runner-up

Doubles: 1 runner-up

Mixed doubles: 1 runner-up

References

External links
National Portrait Gallery, Portraits of Joan Fry

British female tennis players
1906 births
1985 deaths
Place of birth missing